Lokomoko (Lokomoko is Filipino for Niloloko mo ako, English for "You're Fooling Me!") is a Philippine sketch-comedy show produced by ABC Development Corporation and is airing every Sunday 11:30 am to 1:00 pm (PST) on TV5. which was aired from August 15, 2008 to September 8, 2013, and was replaced by Tropa Mo Ko Unli. It was previously titled as Lokomoko and Lokomoko High. For its final version, it was renamed as Lokomoko U.

Brief history
The show was one of TV5's first shows, launched during mid-August 2008. Its original format was inspired by Wow Mali yet it was also a semi-gag show until in February 2009, it was adapted into a full-time gag show format airing on Friday evenings. After a year and two months, it moved to Wednesdays In 2010 with its most current format move to Thursdays in 2010 and eventually are back to Fridays In 2010. In 2011, the show returns to its original format, Lokomoko. In 2011, it was moved to Sunday, 11:30 am. In 2012 the show returns Lokomoko U as revival, in July 2012, it was moved to Saturday, 2:30 pm. In 2013 it was back on Sunday in a new timeslot with one and a half hour show from 11:30 am – 1:00 pm.

Cancellation
Lokomoko U aired on its last episode on September 8, 2013 due to its low ratings. On September 14, 2013, a newest gag show was launched as Tropa Moko Unli replacing Lokomoko U, a combination of a former gag shows Tropang Trumpo and Lokomoko U, the casts are now joined forces to have a newest Gag Show on TV5, and the show was also as a part of Weekend Do It Better on TV5.

Cast
 Alex Gonzaga 
 Randolf Stamatelaky 
 Kim Gantioqui 
 Valeen Montenegro 
 Caloy Alde 
 Cara Eriguel 
 Empoy Marquez 
 Long Mejia 
 Gee Canlas 
 Dianne Medina 
 Brod Pete 
 Krista Valle 
 Louise delos Reyes 
 Voyz Avenue 
 Joseph Bitangcol 
 Princess Ryan 
 Yana Asistio 
 Pauleen Luna 
 Rainier Castillo 
 Luningning 
 Milagring 
 Mariposa 
 JC de Vera 
 Edgar Allan Guzman 
 Arci Muñoz 
 Alwyn Uytingco 
 Tuesday Vargas 
 Eula Caballero 
 Wendell Ramos 
 Vin Abrenica 
 Sophie Albert 
 Akihiro Blanco 
 Chanel Morales 
 Mark Neumann 
 Shaira Diaz

Segments

As Lokomoko High
 Bading Tayong Dalawa, Tadong Dalawa, Payong Dalawa - parodies of Tayong Dalawa teaser
 BTEN: Balitang TEN - a parody of TV5 newscast TEN: The Evening News
 Darney- a parody of Darna and Barney
 Face 2 Face
 Isang Basong Luha - parody of the Japanese Drama One Liter of Tears
 Jessica Shiopao - a parody of GMA's Kapuso Mo, Jessica Soho
 LBM: Loko Bidyo Moko (music video parodies)
 Loko Flush Report - a parody of GMA Flash Report, set on a comfort room where the news anchor reads the news while excreting
 Midnight BJ - a parody of Midnight DJ
 ScotchBob SquarePants - a parody of SpongeBob SquarePants
 Tarantang Pinoy - a parody of Talentadong Pinoy
 Titik Co. "Titik N'ya, Titik Mo, Titik Nating Lahat"
 The Ricky High Exclusives - a parody of Q-27's defunct talk show The Ricky Lo Exclusives
 Totoy Buto - a parody of Totoy Bato
 Wiwiwi - a parody of ABS-CBN's former noontime show Wowowee
 Zorrox - a parody of GMA's Zorro
 Parodies of SNN: Showbiz News Ngayon, The Singing Bee, Matanglawin
 several commercial parodies

As Lokomoko U
 1D La Cruz - a parody of Juan dela Cruz (1D is the nickname for British boy band One Direction)
 Awkward Momments
 Appliance Whisperer
 Babaeng Kutonglupa - a parody of Babaeng Hampaslupa teaser
 Bahaw: Ikalawang Hain - a parody of Valiente and second incarnation of Bahaw: Ang Kaning Lamig on Tropang Trumpo
 Battle Of The Brainless - a revival from Tropang Trumpo's segment and parody of the famous collegiate game show Battle of the Brains.
 Case to Case - a parody of Face to Face
 Dude The Moves
 EsteRomantiko
 Hellfire - parody of short running cooking show Quickfire
 Ina, Kapatid, Anak, Apo - a parody of Ina, Kapatid, Anak
 Jejemon KoW3Ez B33!
  La Bas - a parody of The Buzz
 LBM: Loko Bidyo Moko (music video parodies)
 Lokomentado - a parody of Dokumentado
 Pinoy Brainless - a parody of Eat Bulaga!'s segment Pinoy Henyo
 Please Be Careful - a parody of Be Careful with My Heart
 Que Horror Family
 S.O.S: Sounds of Silence- Sound effects starring Maui Manalo and Miko Aguilar
 Star Factory - a parody of Star Factor
 Talentadong Family - a parody of Talentadong Pinoy
 Tanong Ko Lang, Kulang...
 T3: Pa-Load - a parody of T3: Reload
 WWEeew - a parody of WWE
 Whose Line is it Anyhow? - a parody of popular U.S. game show Whose Line is it Anyway?
 "The Joke of the Philippines" - a parody of an ABS-CBN Talent Show of The Voice of the Philippines. The judges are Tuesday Vargas as Parody of Lea Salonga and Long Mejia as Parody of Apl.de.ap.
 several commercial parodies

Awards
Winner, Best Comedy Program - 19th KBP Golden Dove Awards
Nominated, Best Comedy Gag Show - PMPC Star Awards For TV
Lokomoko High (2009)
Lokomoko U (2010 & 2012)
Lokomoko (2011)

See also
 List of programs aired by TV5 (Philippine TV network)

External links
 
 

TV5 (Philippine TV network) original programming
Philippine television sketch shows
2000s teen sitcoms
2010s teen sitcoms
2008 Philippine television series debuts
2013 Philippine television series endings
Filipino-language television shows